The Bahrain national beach handball team is the national team of Bahrain. It is governed by the Bahrain Handball Federation and takes part in international beach handball competitions.

World Championship results

External links
IHF profile

Beach handball
National beach handball teams
National sports teams of Bahrain